The Men's 100 metres Freestyle event was the 19th event contested on the 2007 World Aquatics Championship for Swimming.

The 22 heats began at 10:21, on 28 March 2007, at the Rod Laver Arena, in Melbourne Park.

The semifinals started on the evening of the same day at 19:00.

The final started at 19:42 on the following day, 29 March.

Records

Results

Heats

Semifinals

Final

References

Swimming at the 2007 World Aquatics Championships